The Quimbys Mill Formation is a geologic formation in Illinois. It preserves fossils dating back to the Ordovician period.

See also

 List of fossiliferous stratigraphic units in Illinois

References
 

Ordovician Iowa
Ordovician Illinois
Ordovician geology of Wisconsin
Ordovician southern paleotropical deposits